Echiabhi Okodugha (born 10 December 1988) is a Nigerian footballer.

Career
Okodugha was playing earlier active for Nigeria Pepsi Football Academy and later with F.C. Ebedei in Nigeria. In 2006, he signed a professional contract with Finnish Veikkausliiga team KuPS, here played in two years forty-two games and scores four goals. He left KuPS for league rival RoPS on 20 February 2009.

References

External links
 
 
 Calcio Lastampa Profile 

1988 births
Living people
Nigerian footballers
Association football midfielders
Pepsi Football Academy players
F.C. Ebedei players
Kuopion Palloseura players
Rovaniemen Palloseura players
IFK Mariehamn players
Pallo-Iirot players
Salon Palloilijat players
Nigerian expatriate sportspeople in Finland
Expatriate footballers in Finland
Nigerian expatriate footballers
Veikkausliiga players
Kakkonen players
Bollklubben-46 players